Steadicam is a brand of camera stabilizer mounts for motion picture cameras invented by Garrett Brown and introduced in 1975 by Cinema Products Corporation. It was designed to isolate the camera from the camera operator's movement, keeping the camera motion separate and controllable by a skilled operator.

History 
Before the camera stabilizing system, a director had a number of choices for moving (or "tracking") shots:
 The camera could be mounted on a dolly, a wheeled mount that rolls on specialized tracks or a smooth surface.
 The camera could be mounted on a crane, a counterweighted arm that could move the camera vertically and horizontally.
 The camera operator shoot hand-held which would produce footage suitable mostly for documentaries, news, reportage, live action, unrehearsed footage, or the evocation of authentic immediacy or cinéma vérité during dramatic sequences.

While these cinematic techniques are still common, smooth and steady tracking shots with lighter weight camera systems was enabled with the creation of the Steadicam in 1975 by inventor and cameraman Garrett Brown. After completing the first working prototype, which was called the "Brown Stabilizer", Brown created a ten-minute demo reel of the new cinematography techniques enabled by the Steadicam and was shown to numerous directors, including Stanley Kubrick and John G. Avildsen. The Steadicam was subsequently licensed to and manufactured by Cinema Products Corporation, which later diversified the brand into a consumer line of Steadicams for light weight DV cameras.

The Steadicam was first used in the Best Picture–nominated Woody Guthrie biopic Bound for Glory (1976). Cinematographer Haskell Wexler had Brown begin a shot on a fully elevated platform crane which jibbed down, and when it reached the ground, Brown stepped off and walked the camera through the set.

Steadicams were then used extensively for chase scenes on the streets of New York City in Marathon Man (1976), which was released two months before Bound for Glory. The Steadicam's third picture was Avildsen's Best Picture–winning Rocky in 1976, where it was an integral part of the film's Philadelphia street jogging/training sequences and the run up the Art Museum's flight of stairs. In many fight scenes a Steadicam was visible ringside, as well as during some wide shots of the final fight. Rocky was also released before Bound for Glory. Garrett Brown was the Steadicam operator on all three films.

The Shining (1980) prompted further Steadicam innovation when director Stanley Kubrick requested that the camera shoot from barely above the floor. This necessitated the invention of "low mode", in which the top of the camera is mounted to the bottom of an inverted post, which substantially increased the creative angles of the system which previously could not go much lower than the operator's waist height.

A Steadicam rig was also employed during the filming of Return of the Jedi (1983), in conjunction with two gyroscopes for extra stabilization, to film the background plates for the speeder bike chase. Brown walked through a redwood forest, with the camera running at a speed of less than one frame per second. The result, when projected at 24 frames per second, gave the impression of flying through the air at perilous speeds. In the Michael Crichton film Runaway (1984), a Steadicam rig was used to simulate the point of view of a futuristic smart bullet in flight while targeting specific individuals by their heat signature.

Description 

The operator wears a harness, the Steadicam vest, which is attached to an iso-elastic arm. This is connected by a multi-axis and ultra-low friction gimbal to the Steadicam "sled" which has the camera mounted at one end and counterbalancing weight (the monitor and batteries) at the other. The monitor substitutes for the camera's viewfinder, since the range of motion of the camera relative to the operator makes the camera's own viewfinder unusable. This is how the Steadicam stays upright, by simply making the bottom slightly heavier than the top, pivoting at the gimbal. This leaves the center of gravity of the whole rig, however heavy it may be, within control of the operator through the gimbal. The skill of the operator is to keep the desired framing and composition by feathering the touch on the gimbal, while the rig and operator is in motion or still.

The combined weight of the counterbalance and camera means that the armature bears a relatively high inertial mass which is not easily moved by small body movements from the operator. The freely pivoting armature adds additional stabilization to the photographed image, and makes the weight of the camera-sled assembly acceptable by allowing the body harness to support it.

When the armature is correctly balanced, operators can remove their hands from the Steadicam entirely and the camera stays in place. During operation, the Steadicam operator usually rests a hand on the camera gimbal and applies force at that point to move the camera. To avoid shaking the camera when lens adjustments are made, a wireless remote operated by the camera assistant is used to control focus and iris.

For low-angle shots, the Steadicam sled can be inverted vertically, putting the camera on the bottom, and the monitor and batteries on the top. This is referred to as low mode operation.

The newest generation is the Tango. A body-supported camera-stabilization-system, its horizontal mechanism makes it possible to move the camera freely while staying horizontal. A Steadicam operator can change from low mode to high mode without any alteration. Dimensions are not limited to ups and downs, but also in depth and over or through obstacles.

The smallest, lightest Steadicam that can be used with a support arm and vest is the Merlin. It is light enough to be hand held with cameras weighing up to about 5.5 pounds (2.5 kg), and may carry cameras up to about 7 pounds (3.2 kg) when used with the arm. The Merlin may be folded and carried in comparatively small spaces such as medium-size camera bags. In its lightest configuration, the Merlin weighs just 12.5 ounces (0.35 kg). Photographers who shoot with HDSLR cameras that combine still and motion photography most often work with the Merlin. Since the Merlin has no facility to carry a separate monitor, cameras suitable for it must have built-in monitors.

Steadicam introduced a camera mount for smartphones, called the Smoothee, in 2012. Marketed to consumers instead of video professionals, its tubular frame supports iPhone and Android phones that are 4.53" to 6.26" long by 2.32" to 3.27" wide (115 to 159 mm long by 59 to 83 mm wide). An adapter can be used to fit a GoPro camera to it. An even smaller, camera-specific Steadicam Curve (a single, curved aluminum slash) is available for GoPro cameras.

Awards and recognition
Academy Award
 1978 – Academy Award of Merit – Awarded to Garrett Brown (the Cinema Products Corporation; engineering staff under the supervision of John Jurgens) for the invention and development of Steadicam.
American Society of Cinematographers
 2001 – President's Award, awarded to Garrett Brown
Society of Camera Operators
 1992 – Technical Achievement Award, awarded to Garrett Brown (and Cinema Products Corporation) for the Steadicam camera stabilizing system.
 2008 – Technical Achievement Award, awarded to Garrett Brown and Jerry Holway (inventor) and Tiffen (developer) for the Ultra2 Steadicam camera support system.
Steadicam Guild Life Achievement Award
 2012 – The Steadicam Guild's Life Achievement Award, awarded to Garrett Brown (inventor and Steadicam operator) for his invention of the Steadicam and his Steadicam work on nearly 100 major motion pictures.
Nikola Tesla Satellite Award
 2014 – Awarded to Garrett Brown for visionary achievement in filmmaking technology

See also 

 1976 in film
 Carl Akeley, invented gyroscope-mounted "pancake" camera
 Image stabilization
 List of generic and genericized trademarks
 MK-V AR
 Panaglide
 Skycam
 SnorriCam
 Spidercam
 Timeline of United States inventions (1946–1991)
 Vestibulo–ocular reflex

References

Bibliography 
 Jerry Holway et Laurie Hayball, The Steadicam© Operator's Handbook, éditions Focal Press
 Serena Ferrara, Steadicam, Techniques and Aesthetics, éditions Focal Press
 Ballerini David, Una rivoluzione nel modo di fare di cinema, Falsopiano, 2012
 « Le Steadicam a-t-il une âme ? » [dossier], Vertigo, n°24, 2003, p. 46-84
 Monassa Tatiana, « Le Tyler Mount et le Steadicam : inventer la stabilisation de la caméra pour libérer le cadre cinématographique », Création Collective au Cinéma, n°02/2019. p. 125-148. 
 Andrzej Dambski, « Le steadicam : d’un usage classique à une recherche de déséquilibre et de vitesse », mémoire de master, dir. Tony Gauthier, ENS Louis Lumière, 2015
 Théo Michel, « Le mouvement-steadicam et la performance du corps : usages, expressions, perceptions », mémoire de master, dir. Antoine Gaudin, Paris 3 Sorbonne-Nouvelle, 2021

External links 

 History of the Steadicam, Tiffen Website
 garrettbrown.com, inventor's official website
 steadicam.com, product's official website
 flysteadicam.tiffen.com, official Steadicam Workshop training website
 "Steadicam Posture"
 "Steadicam Guild Life Achievement Award"
  Produced for the thirtieth anniversary of the Steadicam.

Products introduced in 1976
American inventions
Cinematography
Film and video technology
Photography equipment
Trademarks